Kathleen Krüger (born 17 May 1985) is a German former footballer who played as a midfielder for Bayern Munich. She has worked for the men's professional team of Bayern Munich off the field since 2009, and currently she is team manager of Bayern Munich. She is the only female team manager in the Bundesliga and has been described as "the league's most powerful woman".

Football career
Krüger who grew up in Eching, practiced karate and was even appointed to national competitions. However, due to lack of time, she later gave up karate and concentrated on football. She began in the youth department of FC Phönix Schleißheim, a club in the north of Munich, she later moved to FFC Wacker Munich (de). At the age of 18, she switched to Bayern Munich II in summer 2003.

After eleven league games, in which she remained without scoring, she ended her debut season in the senior division. In the following season, in which she played 14 games, she scored her only Bundesliga goal on May 7, 2006 in a 6–0 home win against FSV Frankfurt with the goal to make it 5–0 in the 48th minute. In the 2006–07 season, she played six matches; in the following two seasons, she was used in only one match, most recently on November 2, 2008 in a 5–0 win in the away game against Herford SV after her substitution for Mandy Islacker in the 79th minute.

At the age of 24, she retired from playing professionally and was already making plans for her future after football. In autumn 2017, she played a few games for the fifth-tier league club SC Amicitia Munich.

Administrative career
After starting her studies in international management, while also working in the organization of the women's Football team at Bayern Munich, she broke off her studies after just one semester and became the assistant to the sports director Christian Nerlinger. After his departure in 2012, she became the team manager of the professional team at Bayern Munich and has since been responsible for organizational matters relating to the team.

References

External links

 
 
 Kathleen Krüger at Soccerdonna.de

1985 births
Living people
FC Bayern Munich non-playing staff
German women's footballers
FC Bayern Munich (women) players
Women's association football midfielders
Frauen-Bundesliga players
Footballers from Bavaria
People from Freising (district)